Elizabeth Jacobs may refer to:

 Elizabeth Jacobs (anthropologist) (1903–1983), American anthropologist
 Elizabeth Jacobs (gymnast) (born 1989), Australian acrobatic gymnast
 Elizabeth Jacobs (politician) (born 1900), British doctor and politician